Thomas's blind snake (Mitophis pyrites) is an endangered species of snake in the family Leptotyphlopidae. It is endemic to the Caribbean island of Hispaniola, where it is found in the Sud-Est Department in Haiti and Pedernales Province in the Dominican Republic.

References

Mitophis
Reptiles described in 1965
Reptiles of the Dominican Republic
Reptiles of Haiti
Endemic fauna of Hispaniola